Stanley "Stan" Kielty (20 July 1925 – 31 December 2008) was an English rugby league footballer who played in the 1940s and 1950s, and coached in the 1960s.

On the field the 'Dean and Kielty' duo became renowned as one of the best and most symbiotic creative partnerships in the game, while off the field Stan and Ken remained good friends years after their playing days came to an end.

Background
Kielty's birth was registered in Castleford, West Riding of Yorkshire, England, and he died aged 83 in Halifax, West Yorkshire, England.

Playing career

International honours
Kielty won caps for England while at Halifax in 1953 against Wales, France, and Other Nationalities.

County honours
Kielty won caps for Yorkshire while at Halifax.

Challenge Cup Final appearances
Kielty played  in Halifax's 4-4 draw with Warrington in the 1954 Challenge Cup Final during the 1953–54 season at Wembley Stadium, London on Saturday 24 April 1954, in front of a crowd of 81,841, and played  in the 4-8 defeat by Warrington in the 1954 Challenge Cup Final replay during the 1953–54 season at Odsal Stadium, Bradford on Wednesday 5 May 1954, in front of a record crowd of 102,575 or more.

Club career
Kielty made his début for Wakefield Trinity during the 1944–45 season, and he played his last match for Wakefield Trinity during the 1946–47 season.

Testimonial match
Kielty's Testimonial match at Halifax took place in 1955.

Honoured at Halifax
Kielty is a Halifax Hall of Fame Inductee.

Honoured by Arriva Yorkshire
Arriva Yorkshire honoured 13 rugby league footballers on Thursday 20 August 2009, at a ceremony at The Jungle, the home of the Castleford Tigers. A fleet of new buses were named after the 'Arriva Yorkshire Rugby League Dream Team'. Members of the public nominated the best ever rugby league footballers to have played in West Yorkshire, supported by local rugby league journalists; James Deighton from BBC Leeds, and Tim Butcher, editor of Rugby League World. The 'Arriva Yorkshire Rugby League Dream Team' is; Trevor Foster MBE, Neil Fox MBE, Albert Goldthorpe, Alan Hardisty, Stan Kielty, Lewis Jones, Roger Millward MBE, Malcolm Reilly, Garry Schofield, Keith Senior, David Topliss, Dave Valentine and Adrian Vowles.

Genealogical information

References

External links
Dean's tribute to 'a great pal' Stan Kielty

1925 births
2008 deaths
England national rugby league team players
English rugby league coaches
English rugby league players
Halifax R.L.F.C. players
Place of death missing
Rugby league halfbacks
Rugby league players from Castleford
Wakefield Trinity players
Yorkshire rugby league team players